Ira Handa Yata (Under the Sun and Moon) is a 2010 Sri Lankan Sinhala war drama film directed by Bennett Rathnayake and co-produced by Samanmalee Hewamanna and Bennett Rathnayake for Ben Films. It stars two debutantes Dharshani Tasha, and Udara Rathnayake in lead roles along with Saumya Liyanage, Jagath Benaragama and Damitha Abeyratne in supportive roles. Music co-composed by Rohana Weerasinghe and Nadeeka Guruge. It is the 1144th film in the Sri Lankan cinema.

The premiere screening of the film was held at 23rd Singapore International Film Festival. The film received positive reviews from critics. The screenplay and some critics reviews were released at 3 November 2010 at Mahaweli Centre, Colombo 7 at 3 pm.

Cast
 Dharshani Tasha as Kiruba Devi
 Udara Rathnayake as Corporal Rakhitha
 Saumya Liyanage as Officer Mahasen
 Damitha Abeyratne	as LTTE female cadre
 Jagath Benaragama as LTTE Soldier
 Sheryl Decker	as Rekha, Rakhitha's fiancée 
 Darshan Dharmaraj as LTTE soldier	
 Sathischandra Edirisinghe as Monk
 Kaushalya Fernando as Bhanu
 Kriz Chris Henri Harriz as James Billworth NGO Worker
 Bimal Jayakody as LTTE area leader
 Mahendra Perera as Nimal
 Rangana Premaratne as Major
 Chandani Seneviratne as Sachitra
 Veena Jayakody
 Roger Seneviratne 
 Palitha Silva as Lieutenant Silva
 Suminda Sirisena as Trader
 Kumara Thirimadura as Captain
 Suvineetha Weerasinghe as Herath Manike

Soundtrack

Awards
 2010 Los Angeles Film Festival Special Jury Honorary Award

References

2010 films
2010s Sinhala-language films
Films about the Sri Lankan Civil War